Los Rosales may refer to the following places in Spain:

 Los Rosales (Madrid), a ward of Madrid
 , a ward of Churriana, Málaga
 , a locality in Tocina, Seville
 Los Rosales, an area in Albacete, Castilla–La Mancha

See also 
 Rosales (disambiguation)